Suman Khatiwada (born 7 August 1999) is a Nepali cricketer who plays for the Nepali national women's team.

In November 2019, she was named in Nepal's squad for the women's tournament at the 2019 South Asian Games. She made her Women's Twenty20 International (WT20I) debut for Nepal, against the Maldives, on 7 December 2019 in the third-place playoff Bronze medal match of the tournament.

References

External links
 

Living people
1999 births
Nepalese women cricketers
Nepal women Twenty20 International cricketers
South Asian Games bronze medalists for Nepal
South Asian Games medalists in cricket